Iron-56 (56Fe) is the most common isotope of iron. About 91.754% of all iron is iron-56.

Of all nuclides, iron-56 has the lowest mass per nucleon. With 8.8 MeV binding energy per nucleon, iron-56 is one of the most tightly bound nuclei.

Nickel-62, a relatively rare isotope of nickel, has a higher nuclear binding energy per nucleon; this is consistent with having a higher mass-per-nucleon because nickel-62 has a greater proportion of neutrons, which are slightly more massive than protons. (See the nickel-62 article for more).  Light elements undergoing nuclear fusion and heavy elements undergoing nuclear fission release energy as their nucleons bind more tightly, so 62Ni might be expected to be common. However, during nucleosynthesis in stars the competition between photodisintegration and alpha capturing causes more 56Ni to be produced than 62Ni (56Fe is produced later in the star's ejection shell as 56Ni decays).

Production of these elements has decreased considerably from what it was at the beginning of the stelliferous era.

Nonetheless, 28 atoms of nickel-62 fusing into 31 atoms of iron-56 releases  of energy.  As the Universe ages, matter will slowly convert to ever more tightly bound nuclei, approaching 56Fe, ultimately leading to the formation of iron stars over ≈101500 years in an expanding universe without proton decay.

See also
Isotopes of iron
Iron star

References

Isotopes of iron